Maxim Ignatovich (born 7 April 1991) is a Russian professional ice hockey player. He is currently playing with Cracovia Krakow of the Polska Hokej Liga (PHL).

Ignatovich made his Kontinental Hockey League (KHL) debut with HC Sibir Novosibirsk, appearing in eight games during the 2009–10 season.

References

External links

1991 births
Living people
Amur Khabarovsk players
HC Neftekhimik Nizhnekamsk players
HC Sibir Novosibirsk players
Russian ice hockey defencemen
Sibirskie Snaipery players
Sportspeople from Novosibirsk